Janmarg, also known as Ahmedabad BRTS, is a bus rapid transit system in Ahmedabad, Gujarat, India. It is operated by Ahmedabad Janmarg Limited, a subsidiary of Ahmedabad Municipal Corporation and others. It is designed by CEPT University. It was inaugurated in October 2009. BRTS won several nation and international awards for design, implementation and operation. It was rated Silver on BRT Standard in 2013.

History
Ahmedabad has a population of more than 6.3 million and an extended population of 7.2 million. It is the sixth largest city and seventh largest metropolitan area of India. The bus rapid transport system was created to serve a growing population.

In 2005, feasibility study reports were prepared by the state project development agency, Gujarat Infrastructure Development Board, and later by CEPT University. The study was headed by H. M. Shivanand Swamy; an economist, urban planner and associate director of CEPT. The project was sanctioned by the Ministry of Urban Development under JNNURM program in 2005.

Technical procedures were started in 2006. 
CEPT designed the system after detailed analysis. Based on an analysis of the socio-economic factors, travel demand patterns, road network characteristics, the metro plan and the existing Ahmedabad Municipal Transport Service (AMTS) route network, a network of roads covering about 155 kilometres in length was identified for developing the BRTS.

The system is named Janmarg, which means the people's way in Gujarati. Trial running started in July 2009. The first corridor connecting Pirana to RTO Junction was opened to public on 14 October 2009 by then the Chief Minister of Gujarat, Narendra Modi. The second half of the first phase of the BRTS was inaugurated on 25 December 2009. It was extended to Kankaria Lake later, to cater to the eastern part of the city, and from Shivranjani to Iskcon Temple on 15 September 2012. On 28 September 2012, it expanded from Soni ni Chali to Odhav. The network expanded to 89 km by December 2015 at the total cost of  1200 crore. The third phase of the project includes the Shivranjani-APMC, Jashodanagar-Hathijan, Sola-Science City, Narol-Aslali and Akhbarnagar-Gota Crossroads stretches. It was approved in 2013 and is under construction. Dedicated buses for women were introduced in January 2016.

In future, BRTS will be integrated with the Ahmedabad Metro, which is under construction. The Gujarat International Finance Tec-City, also under construction, will be accessible through this multimodal mix of rapid transport systems.

Several cities are constructing and planning BRTS based on the model of Ahmedabad such as Bangalore, Mumbai, Amritsar and Bhubaneswar.

Routes 

, following are the currently operational routes; eleven in both directions and two in circular direction; serving 149 BRTS stations and cabins at extended routes.

==Operation==
Ahmedabad Janmarg Limited (AJL), the parent company which governs BRTS operations in Ahmedabad, was constituted as a Special Purpose Vehicle by Ahmedabad Municipal Corporation, Ahmedabad Urban Development Authority and Government of Gujarat. AJL introduced Automated fare collection system through smart cards for commuters.

It has a mixed fleet of air conditioned and non-air conditioned buses. It has 220 Euro III and Euro IV-compliant diesel buses. Parts for the buses are provided by Tata Motors. These buses are built by Chartered Speed locally according to specifications.

The system runs on Integrated Transportation Management System (IMTS) which includes Advanced Vehicle Tracking System (AVLS), Fleet Management System (FMS), Automatic Fare Collection System (AFCS), Passenger Information System (PIS), Passenger announcement (PA), and Vehicle Scheduling and Dispatching (VSD). These technologies are provided by the consortium of Vayam Technologies and  GMV Innovating Solutions since 2010. As a part of Intelligent Transit Management System (ITMS), an app based and QR code powered ticketing system was introduced in June 2017.

Recognition
Ahmedabad BRTS was rated Silver on BRT Standard in 2013. It was showcased at 2012 United Nations Climate Change Conference as a 'lighthouse project' as part of the United Nations Secretary General Ban Ki-moon's Momentum for Change Initiative.

Awards
 National Award for "Award for Excellence in the category of Best IMTS Project – 2011" from Government of India
 International Award for "Sustainable Transport Award – 2010" at Washington DC, United States.
 National Award for "Best Mass Transit Rapid System Project - 2009" from Government of India.
 International Award for "Outstanding Innovations in Public Transportation – 2010" from UITP, Germany
 National Award for "Best Innovation Project Towards Improvement in Urban Mobility in the City of Ahmedabad through New Technological Innovations in Janmarg BRTS – 2010" from Government of India.
 International Award for Design – "Daring Ambition Award and Knowledge and Research Award – 2011" at 59th UITP World Congress, Dubai.
 UITP India Political Commitment Award at 60th UITP World Congress, Geneva on 27 May 2013
 Markenomy Awards 2013 for " Best Urban Infra Mass Transport Project" from Falcom Media at Mumbai

Criticism
BRTS failed to increase the number of public transport users in Ahmedabad. Before launch of BRTS, in 2009, the number of public transport users (users of AMTS) was 8 to 8.5 lakh. After six years of operation, in January 2016, it is found that the number of public transport users (combined users of BRTS and AMTS) dropped to 7.5 lakh. During the same period, the number of private vehicles in the city increased by 54%, up from 18.2 lakh to 25.10 lakh. Only 18% of the total population of the city uses public transport.

In 2011, 42 km network of BRTS had daily average passenger traffic of 1.2 lakh which increased only marginally to 1.32 lakh in 2016 despite expansion of network to 89 km.

In 2015, Ahmedabad Jammarg Limited spent  98 crore on operation incurring loss of  35 crore. In 2015, there are 213 buses with AJL. 80% of them are air conditioned diesel buses which has average of 1.5 km per litre of diesel resulting in increase in air pollution. Air conditioned buses can not be run on CNG and they are meant to attract more passengers. Dedicated BRTS corridors causes traffic jams at several places especially in Old Ahmedabad. As of June 2017, 186 out of 250 Buses are air conditioned.

Accidents 
Between 2016 and 2019, there were 22 fatal BRTS accidents. On 22 November 2019, two brothers, Nayan Ram and Jayesh Ram were crushed to death by a BRTS incident at Panjarapol cross road, Ambawadi.

Gallery

See also 
 Ahmedabad Municipal Transport Service
 Metro-Link Express for Gandhinagar and Ahmedabad
 List of bus rapid transit systems
 :Category:Bus rapid transit

References

External links 

 Institute for Transportation and Development Policy
 Ahmedabad BRTS on Google Map
 Gujarat BRTS in Action on TV9

Transport in Ahmedabad
Bus rapid transit in India
Chief Ministership of Narendra Modi
2009 establishments in Gujarat
Transport infrastructure completed in 2009